2006–07 Azerbaijan Premier League was the fifteenth season of top-tier football in Azerbaijan. The season started with 14 teams, but ended with 13 after FK Gäncä were excluded. FK Baku were the defending champions with the season began on 5 August 2006 and ended on 23 May 2007. At the end of the season the league was dissolved and replaced by the Azerbaijan Premier League.

Teams
MOIK Baku and Göyazan Qazax were relegated after finishing the previous season in 13th and 14th place. They were replaced by Gilan Qäbälä and Simurq Zaqatala from the Azerbaijan First Division.

Stadia and locations

1Karabakh played their home matches at Surakhani Stadium in Baku before moving to their current stadium on 3 May 2009.

Personnel and kits

Managerial changes

League standings

Results

Season statistics

Top goalscorers

Hat-tricks

References

External links
Azerbaijan 2006-07 RSSSF

Azerbaijan Premier League seasons
Azer
1